The Girl Who Leapt Through Time is a 1967 novel by Yasutaka Tsutsui.

The Girl Who Leapt Through Time may also refer to any of the film or television series adapted from or based on the novel:

Toki o Kakeru Shōjo (1983 film)
Toki o Kakeru Shōjo (1994 TV series)
Toki o Kakeru Shōjo  (1997 film)
The Girl Who Leapt Through Time  (2006 film)
Time Traveller: The Girl Who Leapt Through Time, 2010 film

See also
The Girl Who Leapt Through Space